The 1926 Arkansas Razorbacks football team represented the University of Arkansas in the Southwest Conference (SWC) during the 1926 college football season. In their fifth year under head coach Francis Schmidt, the Razorbacks compiled an overall record of 5–5 recor with a mark of 2–2 in conference play, placing in a three-way tie for third in the SWC. Arkansas's games against Ole Miss, Centenary, and LSU counted in the conference standings. The Razorbacks outscored all opponents by a combined total of 179 to 88.

Schedule

^ indicates a designated conference game.

References

Arkansas
Arkansas Razorbacks football seasons
Arkansas Razorbacks football